AJ Balata Abriba
AJ Saint-Georges
AS Oyapock
ASC Agouado
ASC Black Stars
ASC Le Geldar
ASC Remire
ASL Sport Guyanais
CSC de Cayenne
EF Iracoubo
US Macouria
US Matoury
US Sinnamary

French Guiana
 
Football Clubs

Football clubs